Magic Johnson is an American basketball player who played point guard for the Los Angeles Lakers for 13 seasons. Magic Johnson may also refer to:

Magic Johnson Award, annual award created by the Pro Basketball Writers Association for NBA players that recognize excellence on the court and cooperation and dignity with the media and public
Magic Johnson Enterprises, company owned by basketball player Magic Johnson
Magic Johnson Foundation, foundation established by basketball player Magic Johnson
Magic Johnson Theatres, American chain of movie theaters 
Magic Johnson's Fast Break, side-scrolling basketball sports game